The Cotiote War (Kottayathu war) refers to a series of continuous struggles fought between the Cotiote king, Pazhassi Raja Kerala Varma, and the East India Company across a span of thirteen years between 1793 and 1806. Pazhassi Raja aimed to preserve the independence and unity of his kingdom while the East India Company were determined to annex and dismember it. His own desire for independence and sense of betrayal by East India Company on their earlier promise to respect his country’s independence combined with constant exhortations of two of his noblemen, Kaitheri Ambu and Kannavath Sankaran, led to outbreak of Cotiote War. It is the longest war waged by East India Company during their military campaigns on the Indian subcontinent – much longer than Anglo-Mysore Wars, Anglo-Maratha Wars, Anglo-Sikh Wars and Polygar Wars. It was one of the bloodiest and hardest wars waged by East India Company in India – Presidency army regiments that operated suffered losses as high as eighty percent in 10 years of warfare. Cotiote army waged guerrilla warfare, chiefly centred in mountain forests of Aralam and Wynad, and larger zone of conflict extended from Mysore to the Arabian Sea, from Coorg to Coimbatore. Warfare peaked in early 1797, 1800 to 1801, and 1803 to 1804 and due to constant reverses, Bombay regiments were withdrawn and instead Madras regiments were deployed with an increase in number of troops - from 8,000 in 1803 to 14,000 in early 1804. Cotiote War ended within months of the death of Cotiote leader, Pazhassi Raja in a skirmish on 30 November 1805. Following this war, kingdom of Cotiote was annexed into district of Malabar in the Madras Presidency.

The East India Company military had 6,000 men in the beginning which was increased to 8,000 in 1800 and to 14,000 in 1804 - Arthur Wellesley was in charge of operations between 1800 and 1804. Cotiote army manpower is not exactly known - estimates vary between 2,000 and 6,000. Cotiote army was well equipped with fire-locks, but ran short of musket ammunition after 1799 and so used bows and swords widely. 10 years of war had caused 80 percent loss in the East India Company ranks - both European officers and Sepoys. But no estimate is available about death roll in Cotiote armies.

References

 
Battles involving the British East India Company
History of Kerala
1790s in India
1800s in India
1792 in India
1806 in India
Colonial Kerala